Zhansay Smagulov (born 26 September 1992) is a Kazakhstani judoka. He competed at the 2016 Summer Olympics in Rio de Janeiro, in the men's 66 kg.

He won one of the bronze medals in his event at the 2022 Judo Grand Slam Tel Aviv held in Tel Aviv, Israel.

References

External links
 
 
 

1992 births
Living people
Kazakhstani male judoka
Olympic judoka of Kazakhstan
Judoka at the 2016 Summer Olympics
Judoka at the 2018 Asian Games
Asian Games silver medalists for Kazakhstan
Asian Games medalists in judo
Medalists at the 2018 Asian Games
Judoka at the 2020 Summer Olympics
21st-century Kazakhstani people